Mohamad Fikri Makram Rosdi (born 29 June 1993), known as Fikri Makram, is a Malaysian cricketer. He played for Malaysia in the 2014 ICC World Cricket League Division Five tournament in March 2014, and in the 2017 ICC World Cricket League Division Three tournament in May 2017.

He was a member of the Malaysian cricket team which claimed gold medal in the men's 50 overs tournament after defeating Singapore by 251 runs in the finals at the 2017 Southeast Asian Games.

References

External links
 

1993 births
Living people
Malaysian cricketers
Place of birth missing (living people)
Southeast Asian Games gold medalists for Malaysia
Southeast Asian Games medalists in cricket
Competitors at the 2017 Southeast Asian Games
21st-century Malaysian people